The Gulf is a New Zealand-set crime drama series, first broadcast on the Three network on 26 August 2019. The series, described as New Zealand's answer to "scandi-noir", follows troubled investigator DSS Jess Savage, played by Kate Elliott, who solves cases on her home of Waiheke Island, all whilst trying to piece together the events surrounding the death of her husband in a seemingly routine car crash. The title refers to the Hauraki Gulf which separates the island from the mainland.

Following a successful debut run in 2019, the series was commissioned for a second run in early 2020, premiering on March 1, 2021. Outside of New Zealand, the series has been sold to Netflix, Amazon Prime Video in the United States and Sundance Now. The series also broadcast on Alibi in the UK, with the first series airing from February 26, 2020, with each two-part story combined into one single broadcast. The second series premiered on December 15, 2021.

Cast
 Kate Elliott as Detective Senior Sergeant Jess Savage
 Ido Drent as Detective Sergeant Justin Harding
 Timmie Cameron as Ruby Savage
 Dahnu Graham as AJ Jackson
 Bede Skinner as Alex Parsons
 Jeffrey Thomas as Retired Detective Inspector Doug Bennington (series 1)
 Alison Bruce as Senior Sergeant Denise Abernethy
 Mark Mitchinson as Detective Inspector Ivan Petrie
 Pana Hema Taylor as Constable Rory Kerr  (series 1)
 Ross Brannigan as Constable Paul "Pup" Phillips
 Vinnie Bennett as Sgt. Taiaroa Gray (series 2)

Episodes

Series 1 (2019)

Series 2 (2021)

References

External links

2010s German television series
2020s German television series
2010s New Zealand television series
2020s New Zealand television series
2019 German television series debuts
2019 New Zealand television series debuts
German drama television series
English-language television shows
New Zealand drama television series
Television series by Screentime
Television shows filmed in New Zealand
Television shows set in New Zealand
Three (TV channel) original programming